No Pressure may refer to:

Music
 No Pressure (Erick Sermon album), 1993
 No Pressure, a 2018 album by Luniz
 No Pressure (Logic album), 2020
 No Pressure, a 2017 EP by Deante' Hitchcock (with Michael Aristotle)
 No Pressure, a 2017 mixtape by Nipsey Hussle (with Bino Rideaux) 
 No Pressure, a 1993 CD release by Dennis Eveland

 "No Pressure" (French Montana song), a song on the 2017 album Jungle Rules by French Montana (featuring Future)
 "No Pressure" (Justin Bieber song), a song on the 2015 album Purpose  by Justin Bieber (featuring Big Sean)
 "No Pressure", a song on the 2018 album Let's Go Sunshine by The Kooks
 "No Pressure", a song on the 2016 album Greatful by Classified (featuring Snoop Dogg)
 "No Pressure", a song on the 2015 album Working Girl by Little Boots
 "No Pressure", a song on the 2013 album Boss Yo Life Up Gang by Young Jeezy featuring Rich Homie Quan
 "No Pressure", a song on the 2010 album Bang by Rockapella
 "No Pressure", a song on the 2010 album Sempre Lontano by Nina Zilli
 "No Pressure", a song on the 2009 album Calliope Click Volume 1 by C-Murder
 "No Pressure", a song on the 2003 album Dedicated by Lemar 
 "No Pressure", a song on the 1997 soundtrack for Mad About You by Paul Reiser and Helen Hunt
 "No Pressure", a song on the 2011 mixtape Twin Towers 2 (No Fly Zone) by Waka Flocka Flame and Slim Dunkin (featuring Rich Kidz)
 "No Pressure", a song on the 2017 album The New Era Sessions by Rouge
 "No Pressure", a song on the 2016 album Dreamer LP by Nicole Morier
 "No Pressure", a 2017 non-album single by Mahalia
 "No Pressure", a 2017 non-album single by Dana Williams
 "No Pressure", a 2018 non-album single by Drebae featuring Megan Thee Stallion
 "No Pressure", a 2009 single by Trina Broussard
 "No Pressure", a 2007 original track by James Zabiela
 "No Pressure", a 2013 single by Curtis Harding
 "No Pressure", a 2015 song by Michael Wavves

Film and television
 No Pressure (film), a 2010 short film 
 "No Pressure" (How I Met Your Mother), a 2012 episode from season 7 of How I Met Your Mother 
 "No Pressure", a 2019 episode from season 2 of Mustangs FC
 "No Pressure", a 2019 episode of The Unicorn

Other
 No Pressure, a 2014 work by Tali Avrahami

See also

 
 
 "No Pressure over Cappuccino", a song on the 1999 album MTV Unplugged by Alanis Morissette